Striving may refer to:

Perfectionistic strivings (in psychology)
STRIVE Act of 2007, proposed United States legislation
Jihad — for Striving in Islam
Conatus — for the Latin word